TheBus (stylized as THEBUS) is a bus transportation system serving Prince George's County, Maryland, providing Monday-Saturday service. There are 29 bus routes, with most operating between Washington Metro stations in the county, with two routes running to Upper Marlboro. The fare is $1.25, but seniors (age 60+), the disabled, one child under 5 years old, and students (between 2:00PM and 7:00PM) ride free. On October 13, 2008, TheBus began accepting payment using SmarTrip regional farecards. The County has contracted operations and maintenance of THE BUS system to RATP Dev.

History

The idea for Prince George's County establishing its own transit system was initially brought up by Prince George's County in 1986, as a way of providing better transportation access to the Upper Marlboro Courthouse and other important government offices, that were isolated from the many of the other areas of Prince George's County that were served by WMATA's Metrorail and Metrobus System. While WMATA itself could have easily have provided these areas of Prince George's County, it was not very cost effective for Prince George's County to allow WMATA to do so as WMATA would have charged Prince George's County for the costs of operating those particular bus routes. WMATA charges counties the costs of operating some routes, because as regional routes they were not profitable due to lower ridership.  Therefore, Prince George's County decided it would be much cheaper for the county to operate their own transit system instead. Prince George's County learned watching Montgomery County's success of developing its own "Ride On" transit system in March 1975, which also was being asked by WMATA to pay for their buses on routes in Montgomery County. Thus, Prince George's County's "The Bus" system was created in January 1990.

The first two "The Bus" routes that Prince George's County started off operating were routes 20 and 21.  Route 20 would operate between the Addison Road Metro Station (WMATA's Blue Line's northern terminus in Prince George's County at the time, prior to the Largo Town Center extension in December 2004) and the Upper Marlboro Courthouse.  Route 21, on the other hand, would operate between the New Carrollton Metro Station (WMATA's Orange Line's northern terminus in Prince George's County) and  the Equestrian Center, also serving the Upper Marlboro Courthouse as well. After observing the success of these two Prince George's County bus routes, Prince George's County decided to expand its routes in April 1996 from two routes to six. The Bus system was able to increase the number of routes it operated around this time as WMATA's northern Green Line stations in Prince George's County, which notably were the West Hyattsville, Prince George's Plaza, College Park U of MD, and Greenbelt opened about three years earlier in December, 1993. Thus, there were even more residential areas around these stations to serve.  These additional routes would serve areas somewhat already served by WMATA's Metrobus and Metrorail system but instead provide additional transportation service to residents and business living in those areas. Even more routes were added as several Metro Green Line stations opened in January, 2001, which notably were the Southern Avenue, Naylor Road, Suitland, and Branch Avenue Metro Stations. Then, eventually, in December, 2004, PG County's The Bus expanded once again when WMATA's new Blue Line stations, Morgan Boulevard and the Largo Town Center Metro Stations, opened.

Beginning on November 7, 2020, TheBus launched new Saturday service on routes 13, 16, 17, 18, 20, 21, 24, 26, 30, 32, 33, 35, and 36. All routes operate every 30–45 minutes between 6:00 AM and 6:00 PM.

Fleet
, TheBus operates an all-diesel fleet consisting of the following vehicles:

On order

Retired Fleet

Routes 
All routes operate on Weekdays with select routes operating on Saturday. Service usually ends around 6:30 pm.

Suspended Routes
These routes have been temporarily suspended since March 2020 due to the COVID-19 pandemic.

Former Routes
These routes have been served by TheBus at one point but have since been discontinued due to either low ridership, simplification to other routes, or combined into another route.

References

External links 
 
 TheBus at The Schumin Web Transit Center

Bus transportation in Maryland
Transportation in Prince George's County, Maryland
2006 establishments in Maryland
RATP Group